is a 2011 Japanese anime original video animation release. The OVA was directed by Hiroaki Ando, written by Dai Satō and produced by Sunrise.  It is licensed in North America by Sentai Filmworks, it was released alongside another Sunrise OVA, Coicent, on DVD and Blu-ray on November 22, 2011 on the same disc.

Plot
In an isolated prison, there are only four prisoners and a cat. One day, a power outage opens all the locks and all the prisoners are released. However, all the guards are nowhere to be seen and there are no exits. An extraordinary event occurs in response to an old man's strange behavior.

Characters

 His codename is Pokerface, also identified as N17.

 Her codename is Sting, also identified as R21.

 His codename is Pinch-Hitter, also identified as N35.

 Her codename is FlashTradeKiller, also identified as R12.

 His codename is Enplein, also identified as VO.

 The Cat.

References

External links
 Official Website 
 

2011 anime OVAs
Science fiction anime and manga
Sentai Filmworks
Sunrise (company)